This article is a list of Economic and Technological Development Zones in Beijing, China.

Municipality-level development zones
 Beijing Badaling Development Area
 Beijing Daxing Industrial Development Area
 Beijing Economic-Technological Development Area
 Beijing Liangxiang Industrial Development Area
 Beijing Linhe Industrial Development Area
 Beijing Miyun Development Area
 Beijing Shilong Industrial Development Area
 Beijing Tongzhou Industrial Development Area
 Beijing Xinggu Development Area
 Beijing central business district CBD
 Beijing Financial Street
 Tianzhu Airport Industrial Zone
 Yongle Economic Development Area (Chinese Version)
 Zhongguancun Science Park

County-level development Zones
 Changping Beijing International Information Area
 Daxing Caiyu Industrial Area
 Daxing Huangcun Industrial Area
 Daxing Jiugong Industrial Area
 Daxing Penggezhuang Industrial Area
 Daxing Qingyun Industrial Area
 Daxing Yizhuang Industrial Area (Eastern and Southern Sections)
 Daxing Yufa Industrial Area
 Fangshan Beijing Yanfang Industrial Area
 Fangshan Lianggong Industrial Area
 Fangshan Science and Technology Industrial Area
 Fangshan Yanshan Dongliushui Industrial Area
 Fengtai Baipengyao Industrial Warehousing Area
 Fengtai Changxindian Industrial Area
 Fengtai materials Transport Area
 Huairou Beifang Town Jingwei Industrial Development Area
 Huairou Fengxiang Science and Technology Development Area
 Miyun Binghe Industrial Development Area
 Miyun Jinhu Industrial Development Area
 Miyun Julong Industrial Development Area
 Miyun Longyuan Industrial Development Area
 Miyun Luzhou Industrial Development Area
 Miyun Huadu Industrial Development Area
 Miyun Huayun Industrial Development Area
 Miyun Shanqu Industrial Development Area
 Miyun Yunxi Industrial Development Area
 Pinggu Binghe Industrial Development Area
 Pinggu Mafang Industrial Area
 PingguYukou Economic Development Area
 Shijingshan Badachu Hi-Tech Development Area
 Shunyi Caiyuan Industrial Area
 Shunyi Chengguan Industrial Area
 Shunyi Fulida Industrial Area
 Shunyi Hongda Industrial Area
 Shunyi Jinma Industrial Area
 Shunyi Juyuan Industrial Area
 Shunyi Niulanshan Industrial Area
 Tongzhou Green Food Development Area
 Tongzhou Houxian Town Industrial Area
 Tongzhou Jufuyuan Nationalities Industrial Area
 Tongzhou Light Industrial Garments and Garment Decoration Area
 Tongzhou Majuqiao Xinghuo Intensive Industrial Area
 Tongzhou Yongle Economic Development Area
 Yanqing Economic and Technological Development Area

See also

 Beijing central business district
 Beijing Financial Street
 Economic and Technological Development Zones
 List of economic and technological development zones in Shanghai

References

External links
 List of National ETDZs

Economy of Beijing
Economic and technological development zones
Special Economic Zones of China